Ephedra trifurca is a species of Ephedra known by the common names longleaf jointfir and Mexican tea.

It is native to the states of Baja California, Chihuahua and Sonora in northwestern Mexico, and to California, Arizona, New Mexico, Texas in the Southwestern United States. It is found in desert scrub plant communities, in the Chihuahuan Desert, Sonoran Desert, and Colorado Desert.

Description
Ephedra trifurca is a sprawling shrub that can approach  in height. It is made up of erect, sharp-pointed twigs which are light green when young and age to yellowish or greenish gray.

It has curling, pointed leaves at its nodes which are up to 1.5 centimeters long and persistent.

Male plants produce pollen cones at the nodes, each up to a centimeter long, and female plants produce seed cones which are slightly larger and each contain one seed in a papery envelope.

See also
Mexican-tea

References

External links
Jepson Manual Treatment: Ephedra trifurca
USDA Plants Profile
Flora of North America
Ephedra trifurca — U.C. Photo gallery

trifurca
North American desert flora
Flora of the California desert regions
Flora of the Chihuahuan Desert
Flora of the Sonoran Deserts
Flora of Northwestern Mexico
Flora of the Southwestern United States
Natural history of the Colorado Desert
Natural history of San Diego County, California
Flora without expected TNC conservation status